The 2005 K League Championship was the ninth competition of the K League Championship, and was held to decide the 23rd champions of the K League. After the regular season was finished, the first stage winners, the second stage winners, and the top two clubs in the overall table qualified for the championship. Each semi-final was played as a single match, and the final consisted of two matches.

Qualified teams

Bracket

Semi-finals

Final

First leg

Second leg

Ulsan Hyundai Horang-i won 6–3 on aggregate.

Final table

See also
2005 in South Korean football
2005 K League

External links
Review at K League 
Match report at K League 
K League history 

K League Championship
K